Greenwood Personal Credit Ltd. is a finance company supplying home-collected credit in the United Kingdom, a subsidiary of Provident Financial. Their headquarters are in Bradford, West Yorkshire, and there are local Greenwood Personal Credit offices situated in towns and cities throughout the United Kingdom.

History

Greenwood was founded by William Greenwood in Ashton under Lyne, in 1877. Its first office was opened in Oldham in 1879 and by 1901 there were six branch offices in the area. William retired in 1908 and his two sons, Henry Thomas Greenwood and William Arthur Greenwood took over the company. The company was acquired by Provident Financial in 1977 and it now trades under the name of Greenwood Personal Credit Ltd.

Greenwood Personal Credit is part of Provident Financial. As a whole, Provident Financial has 11,400 self-employed Agents serving over 1.9 million customers. These Agents are at the heart of the home collected credit service, visiting customers’ homes every week to collect their repayments and issuing loans. Matthew Taylor summed up their approach to lending as providing ‘a unique service to people with difficult lives who desperately need the personal touch’.

Greenwood Personal Credit caters its service entirely around their customers. A 2010 article in The Guardian reported that (based on a focus group consultation) the most important considerations when selecting a non-mainstream financial product were accessibility, flexibility and client respect. It also stated that ‘people tell us that honesty and simplicity are key factors in deciding to use a product’.

Greenwood Personal Credit offers loans typically from £50 - £500 over terms ranging from 14 weeks up to 52 weeks. The loans are unsecured and repayments are collected weekly from the customer’s home.

Greenwood Personal Credit is licensed by the Office of Fair Trading (OFT).

Operations

Greenwood Personal Credit is a subsidiary of Provident Financial. They also have another home credit subsidiary - Provident Personal Credit and a credit card subsidiary - Vanquis Bank. The home credit operations are based in the head office building on Godwin Street in Bradford and Vanquis Bank is based in London with a call centre located in Chatham, Kent.

References

External links
 Greenwood Personal Credit - Cash Loans
 Provident Personal Credit - Cash Loans
 Provident Financial - Official site
 Provident Personal Credit (Republic of Ireland) - Cash Loans
 Vanquis Bank - Credit Cards

Companies based in Bradford
Companies established in 1880
1880 establishments in the United Kingdom